Horror Masterpiece is the third studio album by Italian extreme metal vocalist Lord Vampyr, released on 25 March 2010. Beginning with this album, Lord Vampyr abandoned the symphonic black metal style of his previous two releases, shifting to a more industrial-like tone.

Track listing

 "Morte e Orgasmo" is Italian for "Death and Orgasm".

Personnel
 Lord Vampyr (Alessandro Nunziati) – vocals
 Lady Eter – female backing vocals
 Seth 666 (Andrea Taddei) – guitars
 Endymion (Riccardo Studer) – keyboards
 Aerioch (Andrea di Nino) – bass
 Aeternus (Diego Tasciotti) – drums
 Stefano Morabito – production

External links
 Lord Vampyr's official website

2010 albums
Lord Vampyr albums